is a retired Japanese figure skater. She is the 2015 World silver medalist, the 2018 World bronze medalist, the 2016 Four Continents champion, a two-time Four Continents silver medalist (2014, 2015), a two-time Grand Prix Final silver medalist (2015, 2016), a two-time Skate America champion (2017, 2018), the 2015 NHK Trophy champion, a four-time CS U.S. Classic champion (2015, 2016, 2018, 2019), the 2014 CS Lombardia Trophy champion, and a four-time Japanese national champion (2014–17).

On the junior level, she is the 2012 JGP U.S. champion, the 2011 JGP Poland silver medalist, the 2012 Asian Figure Skating Trophy champion, and a two-time Japanese junior national champion (2012, 2013).

She placed 4th at the 2018 Winter Olympics.

Personal life 
Miyahara was born on March 26, 1998 in Kyoto, Japan. Her parents are both doctors. Due to her parents' work, she moved with her family to Houston, Texas when she was five years old and had returned to Kyoto by the age of seven. Miyahara learned English during her time in the United States.

On February 13, 2016, Miyahara graduated from Kansai University High School. She has stated her plans to attend Kansai University and major in literature as well as continuing to study English.

Standing five feet tall, she is known to her fan base as the "Tiny Queen".

Career 
Miyahara began skating while she was living in the United States and came under the guidance of Mie Hamada in Kyoto, Japan at the age of seven.

2011–2012 season: Junior international debut
Miyahara became eligible for junior international competition in the 2011–2012 season. She won a silver medal at her Junior Grand Prix debut in Gdańsk, Poland, and finished fifth at her second event in Milan, Italy. Miyahara then won the Japan junior title and placed sixth on the senior level. She was fourth at her first World Junior Championships. Miyahara was invited to skate in the gala at the 2012 World Team Trophy as the Japanese junior national champion.

2012–2013 season: First senior national podium
In the 2012–2013 season, Miyahara won gold and bronze medals at her JGP events in the United States and Turkey, respectively. Miyahara then won the 2012 Japanese Junior Championships, before placing fifth at the JGP Final in Sochi, Russia.

Miyahara won her first senior national medal, a bronze, at the Japanese Championships, finishing ahead of Akiko Suzuki. She ended her season at the 2013 World Junior Championships where she finished seventh.

2013–2014 season: Senior international debut
Miyahara started the 2013–2014 season by winning the Asian Trophy. Debuting on the senior Grand Prix, she finished fifth at the 2013 NHK Trophy, having placed sixth in the short program and fifth in the free skate. At the 2013 Rostelecom Cup, she was sixth in the short program, sixth in the free skate, and fifth overall.

At the Japanese Championships, Miyahara placed fourth in the short, fifth in the free, and fourth overall, behind Akiko Suzuki, Kanako Murakami, and Mao Asada. She was selected to compete at the 2014 Four Continents Championships, where she won the silver medal behind teammate Kanako Murakami after placing fourth in the short and second in the free.

Miyahara finished fourth at the 2014 World Junior Championships — less than a point out of third. She ended her season with a gold medal at the Gardena Spring Trophy.

2014–2015 season: World silver medalist
Miyahara attended a training camp during the summer of 2014 to work with Olympic champion Ilia Kulik on her jumps. She opened the 2014–2015 season with a win at the Lombardia Trophy. Competing in the Grand Prix series, she took bronze at the 2014 Skate Canada International after placing fourth in the short program and third in the free skate. She won another bronze medal at 2014 NHK Trophy (fourth in SP, second in FS). With these results, Miyahara was the second alternate for the Grand Prix Final.

At the Japanese Championships, Miyahara placed second in the short and first in the free on her way to her first senior national title. At the 2015 Four Continents Championships, she won silver for the second year in a row, having won the short program and placed second in the free.

Miyahara ranked third in the short, fourth in the free skate, and second overall at the 2015 World Championships, with personal bests in all competition segments. She was awarded the silver medal behind Elizaveta Tuktamysheva. At the 2015 World Team Trophy, she placed fifth individually and third as part of team Japan.

2015–2016 season: Four Continents champion and Grand Prix Final silver 
In the summer of 2015, Miyahara traveled to southern California to work with Ilia Kulik for the second year in a row, aiming to add more power to her jumps. She opened her season on the Challenger Series, winning the 2015 U.S. Classic. Turning to the Grand Prix series, she took bronze at the 2015 Skate America before winning gold at the 2015 NHK Trophy, defeating three-time World Champion Mao Asada. These results qualified Miyahara for her first senior Grand Prix Final.

She won the silver medal at the event in Barcelona after placing fourth in the short program and second in the free skate with personal bests in the free skate and combined total.

After repeating as the Japanese national champion, Miyahara went on to win gold at the 2016 Four Continents, achieving personal bests in every portion of the competition. She finished fifth at the 2016 World Championships in Boston, the only event of the season where she finished off the podium.

2016–2017 season: Second Grand Prix Final silver 
Miyahara opened her season with a gold medal at the 2016 CS U.S. Classic. Turning to the Grand Prix series, she won the bronze medal at the 2016 Skate Canada International, behind Evgenia Medvedeva and Kaetlyn Osmond, and then silver at the 2016 NHK Trophy, behind Anna Pogorilaya.

In December, she was awarded the silver medal at the Grand Prix Final in Marseille, being outscored only by Medvedeva. Later that month, she defeated Wakaba Higuchi and Mai Mihara at the Japan Championships to win her third national title.

Due to a stress fracture in her left pelvic girdle, Miyahara withdrew from two February competitions, the 2017 Four Continents Championships and the 2017 Asian Winter Games. To focus on recovery she also decided to withdraw from the 2017 World Championships. The hip injury was attributed to low bone density.

2017–2018 season: Olympic season 
Miyahara injured her left foot in July and was diagnosed with inflammation in her right hip in September. She resumed jumping in October. At the 2017 NHK Trophy she finished 5th after underrotating jumps in both nights, but rallied three weeks later to win gold at the 2017 Skate America. She was the first alternate for the 2017-2018 Grand Prix Final in Nagoya, but got promoted and competed in the Final after 2016 champion Evgenia Medvedeva withdrew due to injury. At the Grand Prix Final, she finished third in the short program and fourth in the free skate, finishing fifth overall after lower ranked skaters in the short program performed stronger free skates. Miyahara, while competing well, underrotated two of her jumps in the free skate, also contributing to a lower result.

At the 2017 Japan Championships, Miyahara was crowned the national champion for the fourth time after placing second in the short program and first in the free skate. On December 24, 2017, she was selected to represent Japan at the 2018 Four Continents Championships in Taipei, the 2018 Winter Olympics in Pyeongchang, South Korea, and 2018 World Championships in Milan, Italy.

In Taipei, Miyahara was first after the short program, third after the free and won the bronze medal overall, behind teammates Kaori Sakamoto and Mai Mihara, contributing to a Japanese sweep of the podium.

At the Olympics, Miyahara was assigned to participate in the ladies' short program in the Team Event, with her teammate Kaori Sakamoto chosen to compete in the free skating. She scored 68.95 points, which was the fourth result that night. Team Japan finished fifth overall. In the individual event, Miyahara scored new personal bests with clean performances, placing fourth in both segments of the competition and overall.

At the World Championships, Miyahara was in third after the short program, with a score of 74.36 after underrotating a triple toe loop in her jump combination. In the free skating, she placed third again with a score of 135.72 after making several mistakes on her jumps. She took bronze overall, behind Kaetlyn Osmond (gold) and teammate Wakaba Higuchi (silver).

2018–2019 season 
In preparation for the season, Miyahara worked with a new strength trainer and focused especially on strengthening her hamstrings.  Competing first at the 2018 U.S. Classic, she won gold.  She went on to win the 2018 Skate America event, placing first in both segments. At her second Grand Prix event, the 2018 NHK Trophy, Miyahara placed second in both programs, narrowly winning the silver medal ahead of Elizaveta Tuktamysheva and behind compatriot Rika Kihira.  In the short program, she set a new personal best.  She received two underrotation calls in the free skate, and remarked "I was very nervous in my long program. I am disappointed, but I know that I will try harder, so I do better in the future."  Her results qualified her for the 2018–19 Grand Prix Final, where she finished sixth, following a combination error in the short program and several underrotated jumps in the free skate.  Miyahara deemed it a "frustrating competition", but "I think it will be helpful for the future."

At the 2018 Japan Championships, Miyahara won the short program, slightly more than a point ahead of Sakamoto.  Several errors lead to her placing fourth in the free skate, dropping to the bronze medal position overall behind Sakamoto and Kihira.  She was named to the Japanese team for the 2019 World Championships in Saitama.  Miyahara placed eighth in the short program at the World Championships, after underrotating the second part of her jump combination.  She rose to sixth place in the free skate after making only one minor error.  Miyahara deemed the season as a whole "mentally one of the toughest seasons", and felt she "had more disappointing competitions over good ones", but that the final event was a strong one.

2019–2020 season 
On September 18, 2019, Miyahara's representatives announced that she had moved her primary training base to the Granite Club in Toronto, and was adding Lee Barkell as a coach, though she would continue to be coached by Mie Hamada as well.  Miyahara stated that her main goal was to perform a triple Axel in competition.  She would later say "to grow up, I chose to go to Toronto."

She began her season at 2019 Japan Open, where she placed fourth with a score of 134.94 points, contributing to Team Japan's silver medal.  At 2019 U.S. Classic, she placed first in the short program with 74.16 points and second in the free skate with 130.14 points, once again winning the gold medal at the event.

At her first Grand Prix event, the 2019 Cup of China, she placed second in the short program despite two underrotations.  She was third in the free skate, with three jump underrotations, but remained in second place overall, taking the silver medal.  Competing the following week at the 2019 Rostelecom Cup, Miyahara placed sixth in the short program after doubling a planned triple Lutz and managing only a triple-double jump combination.  She moved from sixth to fourth place in the free skate despite five of her jumps being called underrotated.

Miyahara placed second in the short program at the 2019–20 Japanese Championships after underrotating the second part of her jump combination.  She was sixth in the free skate after falling once and underrotating or downgrading eight jumps, and dropped to fourth place overall, her first time finishing off the podium at her national championships since 2013.  Disappointed, she commented "I was really good at practice, but I could not control myself tonight, especially in the second half."  Despite her nationals finish, Miyahara was assigned to compete at the World Championships in Montreal rather than national bronze medalist Tomoe Kawabata, but the World Championships were cancelled as a result of the coronavirus pandemic.

2020–2021 season 
Miyahara was given a bye to the Japan Championships due to the COVID-19 pandemic making it impractical for her to travel back from her training location in Canada for lesser domestic events. In October, Mie Hamada was removed as one of her coaches on her ISU bio, which listed Lee Barkell as her sole coach. Miyahara was assigned to compete at the 2020 Skate Canada International, but this event was also cancelled as a result of the pandemic.

In December, Miyahara returned to Japan to compete at the 2020–21 Japan Championships. She placed sixth in the short program after performing only an invalid double loop as her solo jump instead of a planned triple. Third in the free skate, she rose to the bronze medal position.  She was assigned to compete at the 2021 World Championships in Stockholm. Miyahara suffered a right foot injury later in December that kept her off the ice for some time. She struggled at the World Championships, placing nineteenth, the first time she had placed outside the top six. In her assessment, "in terms of technique, it wasn't a performance worth talking about."

2021–2022 season: Retirement 
Miyahara withdrew from the 2021 CS Autumn Classic International, and thus did not participate in a Challenger event prior to the beginning of the Grand Prix.  Competing at the 2021 Skate America, Miyahara placed seventh. Her second Grand Prix was initially the 2021 Cup of China, but following its cancellation she was reassigned to the 2021 Gran Premio d'Italia in Turin. She placed fifth at the event, despite a number of underrotations, and said afterward "there were some issues with some things, but at least I landed all jumps today. I think it's a pretty big step from the last two seasons and I think I was in control of myself better."

At the 2021–22 Japan Championships, Miyahara placed fourth in the short program. She was sixth in the free skate after underrotating several jumps, and finished fifth overall. She was named as an alternate for the Japanese Olympic team, and assigned to compete at the 2022 Four Continents Championships. Miyahara subsequently withdrew from Four Continents due to illness, and was replaced by Yuhana Yokoi.

On March 26, Miyahara announced that she was retiring from competitive skating, saying that she had "no regrets. And, I have a lot of dreams for my next step."

Programs

Competitive highlights
GP: Grand Prix; CS: Challenger Series; JGP: Junior Grand Prix

Detailed results

Senior level

Small medals for short program and free skating awarded only at ISU Championships. At team events, medals awarded for team results only. ISU personal best highlighted in bold.

Junior level

References

External links 

 

1998 births
Japanese female single skaters
Living people
Sportspeople from Kyoto
Four Continents Figure Skating Championships medalists
Kansai University alumni
Figure skaters at the 2018 Winter Olympics
Olympic figure skaters of Japan
World Figure Skating Championships medalists
Season-end world number one figure skaters